Sir William Willcocks  (27 September 1852 in India – 28 July 1932 in Cairo, Egypt) was a British civil engineer during the high point of the British Empire. He was an irrigation engineer who proposed and built the first Aswan Dam, the scale of which had never been attempted previously. He later undertook other major irrigation projects in South Africa and in Arab regions of the dying Ottoman Empire.

Biography
Willcocks was one of four sons of a British Engineer posted in Roorkee for Ganges canal works.  He graduated from the Indian Institute of Technology Roorkee in 1872, and joined the Indian Public Works Department the same year. Following the British invasion and occupation of Egypt, he began work with the long-established Egyptian Public Works Department in 1883. He was serving as director general of reservoirs for Egypt when he completed his studies and plans in 1896 to construct the Aswan Low Dam, the first true storage reservoir on the river. He supervised its construction from 1898 to its completion in 1902. He also designed and constructed another dam on the Nile, the Assiut Barrage, also completed in 1902. For his service to these projects he was appointed a Knight Commander of the Order of St Michael and St George (KCMG) in December 1902. He later became chairman of the Cairo Water Works Company, and was also president of the Anglo-Egyptian Land Allotments Company which was instrumental for the urbanization of Zamalek district (then known as Gezireh) early in the 20th century. One of the streets of Zamalek was named 'Willcocks' after him. He left his position in Egypt by 1897 and four years later he was invited to South Africa. With the end of the Anglo-Boer War he was asked to look into the possibility of irrigation projects in the Transvaal and Orange River Colony.

He later became head of irrigation for the Ottoman Turkish government, for what was then the greater area of Turkish Arabia. He drew up the first accurate maps of the region, which were subsequently a great help to British expeditionary forces in 1914 and again in 1915. In 1911 he proposed to have the water brought to the ancient area of Chaldea in Southern Mesopotamia. The Hindiya Barrage was consequently built on the River Euphrates near ancient Babylon, bringing  under irrigation. He worked on irrigation projects in Romania shortly before the outbreak of World War I, and again as late as 1928 in Bengal, where he had received some his early training.

In January 1921 he was put on trial before the Supreme Consular Court of Egypt on a charge of sedition and criminal libel, on account of statements made by him impugning the trustworthiness of the data concerning the Nile irrigation published by Murdoch Macdonald, adviser of the Egyptian Ministry of Public Works. He was found guilty 11 March, and on 16 April he was bound over to be of good behaviour for one year.

He died at the Anglo-American Hospital in Cairo.

Notes

1852 births
1932 deaths
British civil engineers
Knights Commander of the Order of St Michael and St George
19th-century British engineers
20th-century British engineers